America Award may refer to:

 America Award in Literature
 Italy-USA Foundation's America Award